The Abia State Ministry of Culture and Tourism is an Abia State Government ministry established in August 2010 as the body that is concerned with the administration of tourism and cultural affairs in Abia State.

See also
Government of Abia State

References

Government ministries of Abia State
Abia
Abia